Ian Jones-Quartey (born June 18, 1984) is an American animator, voice actor, storyboard artist, writer, director, and producer. He is the creator of the animated series OK K.O.! Let's Be Heroes, based on his Cartoon Network pilot Lakewood Plaza Turbo, which ran on the network from 2017 to 2019. He is also known for his webcomic RPG World and his work on Steven Universe, Adventure Time, and Bravest Warriors.

Early life
Jones-Quartey was born in Hatfield, Pennsylvania on June 18, 1984, and was raised in Columbia, Maryland. He and his family moved to Oakland Mills, Columbia, Maryland, around 1993. His father was a pharmaceutical engineer, and his mother worked as a librarian for the chemical company W. R. Grace. Jones-Quartey attended Long Reach High School in Columbia and the School of Visual Arts in New York City.

Career
Jones-Quartey created the webcomic RPG World, which won Web Cartoonists' Choice Awards in 2001 and 2002. He co-created the web animation series and comedy hip-hop duo nockFORCE, rapping under the stage name "effnocka" along with audio specialist Jim Gisriel.

His first job in television animation was on The Venture Bros.. He went on to be a storyboard supervisor and revisionist for Adventure Time and a storyboard artist for Secret Mountain Fort Awesome. He supplies the voice of Wallow in Bravest Warriors and was the supervising director and co-developer of the Cartoon Network series Steven Universe.

In 2013, Jones-Quartey's short Lakewood Plaza Turbo aired on Cartoon Network as a television pilot. He had pitched the series two years prior when he had been a storyboard supervisor on Adventure Time. The short was retooled as a mobile game entitled OK K.O.! Lakewood Plaza Turbo, which was released on Cartoon Network's Anything app in February 2016. Lakewood Plaza Turbo ran as a network series beginning March 2017, and OK K.O.! Let's Be Heroes premiered on Cartoon Network on August 1.

In 2018, he appeared in the first season of a podcast entitled Drawn: The Story of Animation, from Cartoon Network and HowStuffWorks, which provided listeners with a behind-the-scenes perspective on animation from voice actors, historians, and creators of animated series.

In June 2019, he was a panelist at the Annecy Animation Festival, alongside Rebecca Sugar, at a panel entitled "The Making of Steven Universe". In July 2019, he appeared as a panelist at the RTX Animation Festival at the Fairmont Austin.

Between October 2020 and April 2021, the anti-racism PSAs "Don't Deny It, Defy It", "Tell the Whole Story", "See Color" and "Be an Ally", that he worked on with Rebecca Sugar, featuring characters from Steven Universe, were released on the Cartoon Network YouTube channel.

On September 2, 2019, the film Steven Universe: The Movie was released. Jones-Quartey was one of the co-executive producers of the film, which was executive produced by Rebecca Sugar.

Personal life
Jones-Quartey is a grandson of Theodosia Okoh, the designer of the flag of Ghana; he based the Steven Universe character Nanefua Pizza on her. By 2017, he was living in Los Angeles.

He married Steven Universe creator Rebecca Sugar on December 4, 2019, having been together for twelve years.

Influences
Jones-Quartey cites Akira Toriyama's series Dragon Ball and Dr. Slump as inspiration for vehicle designs of his own. He stated, "We're all big Toriyama fans on [Steven Universe], which kind of shows a bit."

Filmography

Animation
 The Venture Bros. (2006–2010) (inking, art director, animation director)
 Supernormal (2007) (animation director)
 Adventure Time (2010–2013) (storyboard supervisor, storyboard revisionist)
 Secret Mountain Fort Awesome (2011–2012) (writer, storyboard artist)
 Steven Universe (2013–2016, 2019) (co-executive producer, supervising director, storyline writer, storyboard artist)
 OK K.O.! Let's Be Heroes (2017–2019) (creator, story, storyboard artist, writer, executive producer, voice actor)
 Steven Universe: The Movie (2019) (story, co-executive producer)

Voice work

TV shows 
 Steven Universe (Mr. Queasy, Cat Fingers, Actor, Snowflake Obsidian)
 Bravest Warriors (Wallow, Blue Willy, Spizz Drones, Crew Member, W.A.T.E.R, Computer, Emotion Sucker, Robot Sentinel)
 OK K.O.! Let's Be Heroes (Radicles, Darrell, Skateboard Dog, Crinkly Wrinkly, Pird, Corn Shepard, Radicles Mimic, Frat Boi 2, Heart, Boris, Gregg, Baby Darrell, Cookie Man, Pterodactyl, Truck, Moon, Announcer, Old Man Jenkins, Corny Song Singer, Point Trooper, Drone (2), Pen, Evil Radicles, Pickle, Url, Gauntlet, Point Trooper 1, Janner, Nerd 2, Carl, Trad, Small Teen, additional voices)
 Welcome to My Life (Bully)
 Mighty Magiswords (Radicles)
 Steven Universe Future (Snowflake Obsidian)
 The Fungies (Insane Jolt)

Video games 
 Neon White (Neon Yellow)

Comics
 RPG World

References

External links

 Ian Jones-Quartey on Tumblr
 
 RPG World

African-American television producers
African-American screenwriters
Animators from Maryland
Animators from Pennsylvania
Cartoon Network Studios people
Creative directors
American art directors
American male voice actors
American people of Ghanaian descent
American storyboard artists
American television producers
American television writers
American animated film directors
American animated film producers
Living people
1984 births
American male television writers
People from Montgomery County, Pennsylvania
21st-century American screenwriters
21st-century American male writers
21st-century African-American writers
20th-century African-American people
African-American male writers